Where is the Nophelet? is a Soviet 1988 romantic comedy directed by Gerald Bezhanov.

Plot
Talented engineer Pavel Fedorovich Golikov who works at a research institute in a team comprised purely of females, is surprisingly timid and inexperienced in his relationships with women considering that he is more than forty years old. He is still single and lives with his parents who have long dreamed of having grandchildren. They unsuccessfully introduce him to unmarried daughters of friends in the hope that Pavel will finally marry. But suddenly cheerful and reckless Gena comes to Moscow for furniture - Pavel's cousin. At the request of Pavel's parents, Gena decides to stay in Moscow until he finds a wife for his brother. First, Gena disguises Pavel in a new suit, then they get acquainted with various girls using the pick-up line "Where is the nophelet?" ("Nophelet(e)" is an anadrome — the word "telephone" pronounced in the reverse order). But in his quiet fantasies of family life and children, Pavel sees an unknown female passenger, with whom he travels on a daily bus.

Later Gena's wife arrives who is troubled by his lengthy absence - she is an imperious and commanding woman, and as Pavel's parents look at her they even begin to doubt the need to marry off their son. Subsequently Pavel sorts out his timidity and decides to speak with the stranger from the bus.

Cast
Vladimir Menshov — Pavel Fedorovich Golikov, son of Fedor Mikhailovich and Elena Arkadyevna, Gena's cousin
Aleksandr Pankratov-Chyorny — Gena, Vali's husband, father of two children, Pavel's cousin (singing voice by Mikhail Evdokimov)
Valentina Telichkina — female stranger on the bus
Lyudmila Shagalova — Elena Arkadievna Golikova, wife of Fedor Mikhailovich, Pavel's mother, pensioner
Nikolay Parfyonov — Fedor Mikhailovich Golikov, Elena Arkadievna's husband, Pavel's father, war veteran, pensioner
Marina Dyuzheva— Marina, Pavel's colleague
Lyudmila Nilskaya — Vera Simukova, Pavel's colleague
Natalia Konovalova — Nadia, Pavel's colleague
Olga Shorina — Lyuba, Pavel's colleague
Elena Pokatilova — Lena, Pavel's colleague
Yelena Safonova — Alla, Galya's friend
Ekaterina Zhemchuzhnaya — Zemfira, gipsy-speculator and fortune-teller
Irina Rozanova — Valentina, wife of Gena, mother of two children
Inna Ulyanova — Klara Semyonovna, the head of Pavel
Natalia Karpunina — Tamara, Zoya's friend, a student of a medical school
Elena Skorokhodova — Zoya, Tamara's friend, a student of a medical school
Nina Agapova — aunt Emma
Inna Alenikova — Emma
Elena Arzhanik — passer-by who fell for the "nophelet" line
Rita Gladunko — passenger of a trolleybus
Mikhail Kokshenov — trolley driver
Lydia Dranov — cousin of Emma
Olga Kabo — visitor from the Urals
Veronica Izotova — passer-by, who fell for the "nophelet" line
Alexander Pyatkov — thug in a red jacket

Production
The screenwriter Anatoly Eiramdzhan initially wrote the part of Gena for Andrei Mironov. But the actor did not like the idea of getting typecasted as a womanizer, and thus he was to play Pavel in the film instead, but Mironov died in 1987.

Roles for female actresses were decided at random.

References

External links

1988 romantic comedy films
1988 films
Films scored by Aleksandr Zatsepin
Russian romantic comedy films
Soviet romantic comedy films
1980s Russian-language films